Alexandre Ricard, born in 1972, is a French businessman and one of the grandsons of distiller and Pernod Ricard founder, Paul Ricard. He became Chairman & Chief Executive Officer of Pernod Ricard, the world's second-biggest distiller by sales on February 11, 2015. At 43, he is the youngest Chief Executive Officer of the 40 top companies on the CAC 40, the Paris Stock Market.

Education
Ricard graduated from ESCP Europe (Ecole Supérieure de Commerce de Paris) in 1995. He holds an MBA with a specialization in Finance and Entrepreneurship from the Wharton School of Business and an MA in International Studies from the University of Pennsylvania School of Arts and Sciences, which he obtained in 2001. He speaks French, English, Italian and Spanish.

Career
Upon graduation in 1995, Ricard started his career outside the family business. After working at Indosuez in Milan, he  joined Accenture from 1997 to 1999 where he consulted on strategy. He then joined Morgan Stanley in London from 2001 to 2003, specializing in M&A. He has noted that these experiences have provided an outside perspective on the industry and Pernod Ricard.

In 2003, he joined his family's company in the audit department. His M&A skills were used during this period on the purchase of Allied Domecq by Pernod Ricard. In 2004, he was appointed Finance and Administration Director of the Pernod Ricard subsidiary Irish Distillers in Dublin
In September 2006, he became the managing director of Pernod Ricard Asia Duty Free, thus moving to Hong Kong. Two years later, he was asked to head up the Jameson Whiskey brand as CEO of Irish Distillers, an experience he always mentions enthusiastically. 
After going on to manage the Pernod Ricard distribution network, Ricard was appointed Chief Operating Officer and Deputy Chief Executive Officer of Pernod Ricard on August 29, 2012 shortly after his uncle and then-CEO Patrick Ricard suddenly died.

Following Patrick Ricard's death, the Group's Board named Alexandre Ricard as his successor upon the mandatory retirement of then-CEO Pierre Pringuet in February 2015. The succession announcement had been planned prior to Patrick Ricard's death, for the November 2012 shareholder meeting, but was moved up two months due to the circumstances. In the meantime, Ricard worked closely with Pringuet in all strategic matters for the Group. Alexandre Ricard's appointment as Chairman & CEO of the company took effect in February 2015

Other activities
 Brookings Institution, Member of the Board of Trustees

References

External links
 Biography - official website

Living people
French businesspeople
1972 births
Pernod Ricard people